Duke Ellington's Jazz Violin Session is an album by American pianist, composer and bandleader Duke Ellington recorded in 1963 but not released on the Atlantic label until 1976. The album features members of Ellington's orchestra performing with Stephane Grappelli and Svend Asmussen. Trumpeter Ray Nance, who was also featured in the Ellington Orchestra as a singer and a violinist, plays violin throughout the session alongside Grappelli. Asmussen, whose primary instrument was violin, plays viola throughout the session. Each of the string players is given a solo feature: Grappelli plays "In a Sentimental Mood," Asmussen plays "Don't Get Around Much Anymore," and Nance plays "Day Dream." For the remainder of the session, all three string players are featured soloing in turn.

Reception
The Allmusic review by Thom Jurek awarded the album 3½ stars and stated "The soloist and group interplay are gentle, swinging, and utterly and completely graceful and elegant. There is a lighthearted tenderness in this set that borders on sentimentality without ever going there. And the feeling is loose, relaxed, and full of warmth throughout".

Track listing

Personnel
Duke Ellington – piano
Stephane Grappelli, Ray Nance - violin
Svend Asmussen - viola
Buster Cooper - trombone
Russell Procope - alto saxophone 
Paul Gonsalves - tenor saxophone 
Billy Strayhorn - piano
Ernie Shepard - bass 
Sam Woodyard - drums

References

Atlantic Records albums
Duke Ellington albums
1976 albums